Ronald Edwards  (born September 4, 1964) is a game designer involved in the indie role-playing game (RPG) community, and a  game theorist. He created the Sorcerer role-playing game, the GNS theory of gameplay, and The Big Model. Edwards is also co-founder of The Forge, an online community to support indie RPG design and publication.

Early role-playing
Ron Edwards first started playing RPGs in 1978 when he was 14, starting with Dungeons & Dragons, which had been published four years earlier. He also tried other RPGs such as Tunnels & Trolls, Runequest, and his early favorite, The Fantasy Trip. Through high school and university, he continued to play RPGs, and entered an experimental phase in the 1980s and 1990s, playing as many as 200 different RPGs, including Champions, Stormbringer, GURPS, Rolemaster, Cyberpunk 2020, Amber Diceless Roleplaying Game and Over the Edge.

Game design
While Edwards was a graduate student and biology instructor at the University of Florida, working on his PhD and writing a dissertation focused on evolutionary theory, he began to design an RPG he called Sorcerer. He sent the finished game to an existing RPG publisher; the publisher agreed to publish it and sent Edwards a standard contract, which gave the publisher the right to control artwork and marketing, to revise the book in the future if the author did not want to and to terminate the contract at their discretion. Edwards found the proposed contract unacceptable — inspired by indie comic creator Dave Sim, he believed that creators should have control over their own works.

As a result, he turned down the offer to publish, and in 1996, he printed copies of Sorcerer and distributed them using the shareware model, mailing a copy to anyone who asked for it and asking for $5 in return if they liked the game. Soon afterward he produced an ashcan of the game to sell at conventions. He continued to playtest Sorcerer and produced a fully rewritten version of the game that he began selling in PDF form after acquiring the sorcerer-rpg.com domain.

He also produced two PDF supplements – Sorcerer & Sword (1999) and The Sorcerer's Soul (2000) – and also licensed Concept Syndicate to sell Sorcerer on a CD-ROM.

Game theory
During the 1990s, Edwards was involved in discussions on Usenet about the theory of gameplay during RPGs, debating topics such as the fiction generated during role-playing — in Edwards' words, "when it is or isn't a story, and if it is, how it got that way." As Edwards monitored the Usenet discussions, he realized that different players brought dramatically different priorities to the table — what he called Gamism, Narrativism, and Simulationism. In an online article in 1999, Edwards started to posit what would become his "GNS Theory" of how those three elements were related to techniques used during role-playing.

He also began to discuss the "Big Model" of role-playing, saying, "We needed to be discussing roleplaying as a social event, which was even bigger than individual, or better, expected shared-group priorities. The name 'Big Model' refers to this 'bigness,' starting with everything that plays into who we are and why we sit down to play together." In the "Big Model", Edwards explores the layers of the role-playing game: the social event as the outer layer, the imaginary material lying beneath that, and the rules system as the inner core.

The Forge and Adept Press
With Ed Healy, Edwards created the website Hephaestus's Forge in December 1999, as a creator-owned-game publisher site. The original site closed in late 2000 due to hosting problems, but Edwards and Clinton R. Nixon resurrected the site as "The Forge" in April 2001, hosted at indie-rpgs.com. It continued to run successfully until 2012.

After seeing Obsidian: The Age of Justice, an RPG independently published by Micah Skaritka, Dav Harnish, and Frank Nolan, for sale at Gencon 33 in 2000, Edwards decided he could publish his own RPG books while retaining ownership. He created Adept Press, through which he published his second RPG, Elfs (2001) as a PDF. He also re-published Sorcerer as a 128-page hardcover volume in 2001. RPG historians Steven Torres-Roman and Cason Snow believe this was a turning point for indie RPGs, saying that when Edwards released the hardcover version, he "showed independent game designers the way to publish their own games." Ron Edwards and Sorcerer subsequently won the second annual Diana Jones Award for "excellence in gaming" in 2002.

Edwards purchased a booth at GenCon 34 in 2001 for Adept Press; the following year, the booth was doubled in size to also include The Forge.

In a departure from his Sorcerer material, Edwards released the unusual RPG Trollbabe in 2002, where all players take on the role of Trollbabes, large female trolls.

In 2004, he returned to Sorcerer with the third supplement, Sex and Sorcery. In 2006, he created an RPG called It Was a Mutual Decision during a 24-hour challenge that he himself had set for other RPG designers. In 2007, he created Spione: Story Now in Cold War Berlin, an RPG set in Cold War Berlin. In 2009, he published the unusual two-player RPG S/lay w/Me, where one player is the hero while the other takes on the role of both the hero's lover and his monstrous opponent. In 2015, Edwards created Circle of Hands, a gritty low-magic RPG set in the Iron Age.

Awards
In 2002, Ron Edwards and his role-playing game Sorcerer were awarded the Diana Jones Award for Excellence in Gaming. The award citation reads in part "First self-published online for as a for-sale PDF, Sorcerer — together with its creator and publisher Ron Edwards — represent the potential of the independent innovator in today’s RPG industry [...] His successful nurturing of an online forum dedicated to creator-controlled games have leveraged a mere brilliant game design into the seed crystal of something with the potential to greatly improve adventure gaming."

Also in 2002, Edwards was awarded an Indie RPG Award in the category "Human of the Year". His award citation reads in part "He has single-handedly done more for the indie RPG industry than anyone by helping folks get started or into the industry, promoting others' games, and generally being an amazing rescource to us all [...] He is a bloody powerhouse of rock and roll game-designerdom. The man is unstoppable. He's a walking explosion of indie gaming coolness."

RPGs and supplements
 Sorcerer 
 Sorcerer & Sword 
 The Sorcerer's Soul 
 Sex and Sorcery 
 Elfs
 Trollbabes
 It Was a Mutual Decision
 Spione: Story Now in Cold War Berlin 
 S/lay w/Me
 Circle of Hands

References

External links
 Adept-Press: all of Ron Edwards' games
 Spione:  Story Now in Cold War Berlin
 Interview at Flames Rising

Essays
 "System Does Matter" by Ron Edwards
 "GNS and Other Matters of Role-playing Theory" by Ron Edwards

1964 births
American non-fiction writers
Indie role-playing game designers
Living people
Role-playing game designers